Washington Township is one of twelve townships in Buchanan County, Missouri, USA.  As of the 2010 census, its population was 78,865.

Washington Township was established in 1842, and named after President George Washington.

Geography
It contains nine cemeteries: Ashland, B'nai Sholem, Memorial Park, Mount Auburn, Mount Mora, Mount Olivet, Nelson, Ozenberger and Walnut Grove.

Browning Lake and Lake Contrary are within this township. The streams of Candy Creek, Roys Branch and Whitehead Creek run through this township.

Transportation
Washington Township contains three airports or landing strips: Butchs Strip, Mosaic Hospital West Heliport and Rosecrans Memorial Airport.

References

External links
 US-Counties.com
 City-Data.com
 USGS Geographic Names Information System (GNIS)

Townships in Buchanan County, Missouri
Townships in Missouri